The Irish Writers' Union  (IWU) is an organisation devoted to furthering the professional interests and needs of writers in various media in Ireland.  The Union is based in the Irish Writers Centre building, in the centre of Dublin at 19 Parnell Square.

History
The foundations for the Irish Writers Union were laid in 1985 when Jack Harte, at that time principal of Lucan Vocational School, Co. Dublin, set up a writers' advisory office, availing of the Social Employment Scheme.  Harte employed a secretary and two workers in this office, one of whom, Joe Jackson, went on to become Ireland's first Writer-in-Residence.  From the outset, the aim of the project Harte had in mind was to establish a Writers' Union and an Irish Writers' Centre.

Still working from his base in Lucan, Harte employed the poet Padraig MacGrane to collect names of writers, setting up a preliminary social network of people who could be contacted.  Names and contact details were obtained in a rather informal manner, often handwritten on spare scraps of paper. With his contact list completed, in the summer of 1986 Harte sent out a letter to all those on it, outlining the plans and objectives of the proposed union and asking the recipients if they were interested in joining.  Most of those contacted expressed an interest.

In the autumn of 1986, approximately 120 members-to-be met up in Buswell's Hotel, Kildare Street, Dublin to hammer out the constitution of the writers' union.  Over a three-hour meeting, from three to six o'clock of a Saturday afternoon, a 65-clause constitution was worked out.
The Irish Writers Union was launched on 15 December 1987 at the Guinness Brewery in Dublin, its constitution coming into effect as of 1 January 1987.  Harte was its first chairperson, a post he was to retain for three years.

Among the issues facing the union was the question of authors' rights over their work, and the rights of authors and publishers alike.  From its early years, the IWU supported the idea of a model contract for writers and advised authors in this regard, helping writers negotiate their contracts with publishers. To this day, this service remains central to the activities of the Union.

There was a lack of clarity around copyright in Ireland in the 1980s, and in part due to the efforts of the Irish Writers Union, the situation was clarified in keeping with international best practice. Today Irish publishing contracts accord with Ireland's Copyright & Related Rights Act, 2000 and state unambiguously that the author is the copyright holder.

Censorship

The censorious attitude of the Irish state towards a wide variety of publications and movies was a very restrictive one through much of the mid twentieth century; many books now considered central to Ireland's literary heritage, such as James Joyce's Ulysses, were banned from sale or distribution in Ireland. Although Brian Lenihan Snr introduced the Censorship of Publications Act, 1967 whereby the previously permanent ban on a given work was replaced by a twelve-year ban (and later a five-year ban), this did little to assist the distribution of short-lived works.

In the 1980s a new Censorship of Publications Board composed of a body of retired judges started banning books afresh, among them works by Angela Carter; Alex Comfort's The Joy of Sex; and various academic volumes dealing with erotic Classical art. The ban was upheld against the protests of the Writers' Union.  A member of the Senior Council offered to take up the Union's cause on a pro bono basis, on the grounds that the Board were interfering with the legitimate rights of authors to earn a living.

The poet and IWU member Robert Gracen had known Alex Comfort from their days as medical students in Dublin and put Jack Harte in touch with Comfort. On the grounds of performing a reading from his poetry, Comfort felt able to accept an invitation to appear at Buswell's Hotel, an event at which Comfort's views as a medical doctor and scientist on the importance of being able to write about sexual matters were aired. Such acts as these chipped away at the authority of the Censorship Board and when its five-year ban expired, The Joy of Sex duly appeared on Irish bookshop shelves.

Acquiring a home base

From 1987 onwards, Taoiseach Charles Haughey appointed writer Anthony Cronin as his advisor for Arts policy. Although Cronin had no money to finance a centre for the Union either personally or in his political capacity, Harte presented him with a suggestion for a Writers' Centre.  A large number of old Georgian houses were falling into disuse in the inner suburbs of Dublin; Harte suggested that Cronin petition that one of these be set aside as a centre for supporting and promoting Irish authors. Harte had heard about the Writers' Museum, directed by Matt McNulty; he went to McNulty asking about the possibility of establishing a Writers' Centre.  McNulty provided premises for this purpose at 19 Parnell Square. The Irish Writers Centre was founded in 1991, it is Ireland's national resource centre for writers.

The Writers' Centre was intended initially as a general Arts Centre.  All related writers' support groups were directly involved and represented at this address, including those working with playwrights, children's writers and translators.  Since then, there has been some dispersal of these roles, with playwrights (represented by the Irish Playwrights and Screenwriters Guild), for instance, being based at the Irish Film Institute on Eustace Street in Temple Bar.

The renovation of the premises on Parnell Square was funded by a £100,000 grant from the Irish Lottery.

Aims and accomplishments

The Union states on its website that its aims are as follows:
 To advance the cause of writing as a profession, and organise Irish authors.  It is also the Union’s policy to provide advice and support to writers in their relations with publishers and other users of their work (including offering model contracts and providing assistance in disputes).  The Union hopes thereby to achieve better remuneration and conditions for writers, while monitoring contracts and royalty payments to authors or their estates.
 To provide a means for the expression of the collective opinion of writers on matters affecting their profession.
 To contribute to Governmental educational policy in so far as it relates to the art of writing and the use of literature in the educational system.
 To campaign against all forms of censorship.

A major campaign undertaken by the Union in regard to changing government policy was to lobby throughout the early years of the twenty-first century for a Public Lending Rights scheme, in this the IWU worked closely with the European Writers Congress (EWC) and the Irish Copyright Licensing Agency (ICLA). Such a scheme came into effect with the Copyright Bill 2007, on 28 November 2007 after the European Commission had taken legal action against Ireland in the European Court of Justice for failure to implement a PLR system. It declared that Ireland breached the Lending Rights Directive 1992 by exempting all public libraries from PLR in the Copyright and Related Rights Act, 2000.

One of the central concerns for the IWU was that funding of Irish PLR came directly from the Exchequer and not from public libraries' budgets and the IWU welcomed the fact that the scheme was in fact introduced on this basis.

Membership and meetings

Full membership of the IWU is open to those who have had a novel, non-fiction book or volume of poetry published, a play performed publicly, or any equivalent achievement in the literary arts.  Associate membership is open to others ("established, struggling or forever hopeful") who satisfy the Committee that they are actively engaged in writing.

Former and current 'honorary life members' of the IWU include Michael D Higgins, William Trevor, Robert Greacen, Liam Mac Uistin, Benedict Kiely and Sam McAughtry.

The Executive Committee of the Union meet monthly through most of the year at 19 Parnell Square and an AGM open to all members takes place annually in the same premises, usually in March.

Literary events and international affiliations

The Union is involved in literary events through the European Writers' Council, and maintains links with other literary bodies throughout Europe.  Its members frequently take part in literary festivals in various European countries. The IWU is a nominating body for a number of prestigious international writing awards and is frequently called upon to provide judges for national and international writing competitions.

References

External links 
 The Irish Writers Union Website

Irish writers
Irish literature
Cultural organisations based in the Republic of Ireland